Cumnock railway station may refer to:

Cumnock (original) railway station, East Ayrshire, Scotland
Cumnock (second) railway station, East Ayrshire, Scotland
Cumnock railway station, New South Wales, Australia